Handsome may refer to:
Physical attractiveness
Human physical appearance

Music
Handsome (band), an American rock band

Albums
Handsome (EP), 1989 EP by American band Tar
Handsome (Handsome album), 1997
Handsome (Kilburn and the High-Roads album), 1975

Songs
"Handsome" (song), a 2015 song by The Vaccines
"Handsome", a 1991 song by Camouflage from Meanwhile
"Handsome", a 2008 song by Sky Larkin
"Handsome", a 2019 song by Chance the Rapper featuring Megan Thee Stallion from The Big Day
"Handsome", a 2020 song by Dave East from Karma 3

Film
Handsome: A Netflix Mystery Movie, 2017
Rocky Handsome: a 2016 Hindi Movie

People
Ara the Handsome, a legendary Armenian hero
Fernando I the Handsome (1345–1383), King of the Kingdom of Portugal
Geoffrey the Handsome or Geoffrey Plantagenet (1113–1151), Count of Anjou, Duke of Normandy, and father of King Henry II of England
Oleg I the Handsome (13th century), Prince of Ryazan (in present-day Russia)
Philibert the Handsome or Philibert II (1480–1504), Duke of Savoy
Philip the Handsome or Philip I (1478–1506), Duke of Burgundy and King of Castile
Radu the Handsome or Radu cel Frumos (1439—1475), prince of the principality of Wallachia (Romania)

Ships
, a British cargo ship in service 1970-71
, a Panamanian cargo ship in service 1971-79

See also